The 2019 Copa do Brasil final stages were the final stages (round of 16, quarter-finals, semi-finals and finals) of the 2019 Copa do Brasil football competition. They were played from 15 May to 18 September 2019. A total of 16 teams competed in the final stages to decide the champions of the 2019 Copa do Brasil.

Format
In the final stages, each tie was played on a home-and-away two-legged basis. If tied on aggregate, the away goals rule would not be used, extra time would not be played and the penalty shoot-out would be used to determine the winner.

Bracket

Round of 16

Draw
The draw for the round of 16 was held on 2 May 2019, 15:00 at CBF headquarters in Rio de Janeiro. The 16 qualified teams were divided in two pots. Teams from Pot 1 were the ones which competed at the 2019 Copa Libertadores. Pot 2 was composed of the five teams which qualified through the Fourth Stage plus the champions of 2018 Copa Verde, 2018 Copa do Nordeste and 2018 Campeonato Brasileiro Série B.

CBF ranking shown in brackets.

Matches

The first legs were played from 15 to 23 May and the second legs were played from 29 May to 6 June 2019.

|}
All times are Brasília time, BRT (UTC−3)

Match 76

Internacional won 4–1 on aggregate and advanced to the quarter-finals.

Match 77

Flamengo won 2–0 on aggregate and advanced to the quarter-finals.

Match 78

Atlético Mineiro won 2–1 on aggregate and advanced to the quarter-finals.

Match 79

Grêmio won 3–0 on aggregate and advanced to the quarter-finals.

Match 80

Palmeiras won 3–0 on aggregate and advanced to the quarter-finals.

Match 81

Athletico Paranaense won 1–0 on aggregate and advanced to the quarter-finals.

Match 82

Tied 3–3 on aggregate, Cruzeiro won on penalties and advanced to the quarter-finals.

Match 83

Bahia won 2–0 on aggregate and advanced to the quarter-finals.

Quarter-finals

Draw
The draw for the quarter-finals was held on 10 June 2019, 15:00 at CBF headquarters in Rio de Janeiro. All teams were placed into a single pot.

CBF ranking shown in brackets.

Matches

The first legs were played on 10 and 11 July and the second legs were played on 17 July 2019.

|}
All times are Brasília time, BRT (UTC−3)

Match 84

Grêmio won 2–1 on aggregate and advanced to the semi-finals.

Match 85

Tied 2–2 on aggregate, Athletico Paranaense won on penalties and advanced to the semi-finals.

Match 86

Cruzeiro won 3–2 on aggregate and advanced to the semi-finals.

Match 87

Tied 1–1 on aggregate, Internacional won on penalties and advanced to the semi-finals.

Semi-finals

Draw
The draw to determine the home-and-away teams for both legs was held on 22 July 2019, 15:00 at CBF headquarters in Rio de Janeiro.

Matches

The first legs were played on 7 and 14 August and the second legs were played on 4 September 2019.

|}
All times are Brasília time, BRT (UTC−3)

Match 88

Tied 2–2 on aggregate, Athletico Paranaense won on penalties and advanced to the finals.

Match 89

Internacional won 4–0 on aggregate and advanced to the finals.

Finals

Draw
The draw to determine the home-and-away teams for both legs was held on 5 September 2019, 15:00 at CBF headquarters in Rio de Janeiro.

Matches
The first leg was played on 11 September and the second leg was played on 18 September 2019.

|}
All times are Brasília time, BRT (UTC−3)

Match 90

References

2019 Copa do Brasil